Lilygreen is a surname. It may refer to:

Chris Lilygreen (born 1965), Welsh footballer and football manager
Jon Lilygreen (born 1987), Welsh singer, who along with the band The Islanders represented Cyprus in the Eurovision Song Contest 2010
Lilygreen & Maguire, Welsh pop rock duo formed in 2011 made up of  Jon Lilygreen and Jon Maguire